Chinmaya Mission College is an institution under Chinmaya Mission Education & Cultural Trust, situated in  Kolazhy, Thrissur, Kerala. 

The college is affiliated with the University of Calicut, and the off-campus study center of Bharathiar University, Coimbatore. It offers a wide variety of courses like BBA, BCA, B.Sc (Mathematics) and B.Com. The institution was established in 1975 by Swami Chinmayananda.

Affiliation
 Chinmaya Vidyalaya

 University of Calicut

References
http://cmctsr.org/
 https://web.archive.org/web/20100106234057/http://www.chinmayamission.com/lnstitutions-list.php

Arts and Science colleges in Kerala
Colleges in Thrissur
Colleges affiliated with the University of Calicut
Universities and colleges affiliated with the Chinmaya Mission
Educational institutions established in 1975
1975 establishments in Kerala